Douglas Stuart Ringholt (born 8 September 1942) is a former Australian rules footballer who played with Carlton in the Victorian Football League (VFL).

Notes

External links 

Doug Ringholt's profile at Blueseum

1942 births
Carlton Football Club players
Living people
Australian rules footballers from Victoria (Australia)